Ryler DeHeart and Pierre-Ludovic Duclos were the defending champions and only Duclos decided to participate.
He played with Alex Kuznetsov, but they lost to Jordan Kerr and Travis Parrott in the first round.
The Australian/American pair reached the final, where Treat Conrad Huey and Bobby Reynolds defeated them 7–6(9–7), 6–4.

Seeds

Draw

Draw

References
 Main Draw

Nielsen Pro Tennis Championship - Doubles
2011 Doubles